Live at High Voltage is a 2-CD set released by the progressive rock band Spock's Beard recorded by Concert Live. It features the band's complete performance at the UK's High Voltage Festival on one CD, with a second blank CD provided to burn online content onto (which includes an interview and photo gallery).

It is notable for featuring Neal Morse joining the band to perform "The Light" and "June". This marks his second reunion with his former band since his departure following the release of Snow (2002). Following Nick D'Virgilio's departure from Spock's Beard in November 2011, both Jimmy Keegan and Ted Leonard became official members of the band.

Track listing
 "On a Perfect Day"
 "The Doorway"
 "The Emperor's Clothes"
 "The Light"
 "June"

Personnel
 Alan Morse – guitars, backing vocals
 Ryo Okumoto – keyboards, backing vocals
 Dave Meros – bass guitar, backing vocals

Additional personnel
 Ted Leonard – lead vocals, guitar, keyboards
 Jimmy Keegan – drums
 Neal Morse – guitar and lead vocals on the final part of "The Light" and "June"

References

Spock's Beard albums
2011 live albums
Inside Out Music live albums